The Pittsburgh Bulls were a member of the Major Indoor Lacrosse League from 1990 to 1993.They were based in Pittsburgh, Pennsylvania. The National Lacrosse League would return to Pittsburgh in 2000 with the Pittsburgh CrosseFire, but the team would only stay for one season before moving to become the Washington Power.

All time Record

See also
 Lacrosse in Pennsylvania

Bulls
Lacrosse clubs established in 1990
Lacrosse clubs disestablished in 1993
Lacrosse teams in Pennsylvania
1990 establishments in Pennsylvania
1993 disestablishments in Pennsylvania
Defunct National Lacrosse League teams